Dushi may refer to:

 Dushi, Albania, also known as Dush, Albania, a town in Shkodër County, Albania
 Dushi, Afghanistan, a town in Baghlan Province Afghanistan
 Dushi District, an administrative district in Baghlan Province Afghanistan
 Dushi, Chongqing, a town in Jiangjin District, Chongqing, China
 Dushi, Jiangxi, a town in Fengcheng, Jiangxi, China
 Dushi, Nigeria, a village in northern Nigeria,